Sophie Leung Lau Yau-fun, OBE, GBS, JP (born 9 October 1945, Macau) is a resident of the Hong Kong SAR, Mrs. Sophie Leung had been a Member of the Legislative Council of HKSAR from 1996 to 2012, representing the textile and garment industry, and has been a Deputy of the National People's Congress of the People's Republic of China since 2003.

She is a director since the 1970s of a number of large textile conglomerates in Hong Kong with businesses extending globally, she and her husband, Brian Leung Hung-tak :zh:梁孔德, chairman of the Hong Kong Football Association. She founded Seattle Pacific Industries, a privately held company, which manufactures, markets and distributes casual wear under their own fashion labels such as “Union Bay” and “Sergio Valente” in the United States, with annual sales of over US$200 million. Casual wear bearing fashion labels owned by Seattle Pacific Industries are sold in over 3,000 outlets in the United States, including major high-end department stores such as Macy's, Nordstrom, Neiman Marcus and JC Penney.

Legislation
 HKSAR Deputy, 12th Of National People's Congress, PRC (2013–17)
 Councillor, Fourth Term of The Legislative Council of Hong Kong Special Administrative Region (2008-2012)
 Member of Finance Committee (2008-2012)
 Chairman, Committee on Members' Interests, Legislative Council (2008-2012)
 Member, Panel on Commerce and Industry, Legislative Council (2008-2012)
 Member, Panel on Constitutional Affairs, Legislative Council (2008-2012)
 Member of Panel on Development (2008-2012)
 Member of Panel on Housing (2010-2012)
 Member, Subcommittee on Parliamentary Liaison Subcommittee (2008-2012)

Personal life
Mrs. Sophie Leung was educated in the United States, and is married with three children.

References

1945 births
Living people
Macau emigrants to Hong Kong
Hong Kong textiles industry businesspeople
Delegates to the 10th National People's Congress from Hong Kong
Delegates to the 11th National People's Congress from Hong Kong
Delegates to the 12th National People's Congress from Hong Kong
University of Illinois alumni
Liberal Party (Hong Kong) politicians
Economic Synergy politicians
Officers of the Order of the British Empire
Recipients of the Gold Bauhinia Star
Recipients of the Silver Bauhinia Star
Members of the Provisional Legislative Council
HK LegCo Members 1998–2000
HK LegCo Members 2000–2004
HK LegCo Members 2004–2008
HK LegCo Members 2008–2012
20th-century Hong Kong women politicians
21st-century Hong Kong women politicians